Vladimír Olegovic Zábrodský (7 March 1923 – 20 March 2020) was a Czechoslovak ice hockey and tennis player. Born in Prague, Czechoslovakia, he won a silver medal with the Czechoslovakian national team at the 1948 Winter Olympics, and won the world championships (1947 and 1949). Zábrodský was also a tennis player and member of the Czechoslovakian Davis Cup team.

Ice hockey career
He was one of the inaugural members of the International Ice Hockey Federation Hall of Fame, inducted in 1997. He played in the Czechoslovak First Ice Hockey League for LTC Prague from 1940 to 1950, Spartak ČKD Sokolovo from 1950 to 1960, and Bohemians ČKD Praha from 1963 to 1965, collecting 306 goals.

Tennis career
Zábrodský also represented Czechoslovakia in the Davis Cup during 1948, 1955, and 1956.  He made his Davis Cup debut for Czechoslovakia in the 1948 Europe Zone second round tie against Brazil. He played the doubles rubber with Jaroslav Drobný, beating the Brazilian pair of Manoel Fernandes and Ernesto Petersen in straight sets. He also participated in the 1948 Europe Zone Final, where he played in the dead singles rubber against Torsten Johansson, losing in four sets.  Zábrodský's last Davis Cup appearance was in the losing second round tie against Denmark in the 1956 Europe Zone draw. Zábrodský played in five singles Davis Cup rubbers, two of which he won and also in five doubles rubbers, with three wins.

Personal and later life
Zábrodský was born in Prague. His mother was Russian, and his brother Oldřich was also a hockey player.

In 1965 Zábrodský defected to Sweden, where he would spend the rest of his life. Zábrodský and his wife used fake passports and traveled through Hungary and Yugoslavia before reaching Switzerland, where Oldřich, who was playing for Lausanne HC, met them. He took up coaching ice hockey, and worked for Leksands IF, Djurgårdens IF, and Rögle BK. Later on Zábrodský returned to tennis, serving as a coach. He died on 20 March 2020 in Stockholm at the age of 97.

References

External links
 Profile
 IIHF Hockey Hall of Fame bio
 

1923 births
2020 deaths

Czechoslovak people of Russian descent
Czechoslovak emigrants to Sweden
Czechoslovak male tennis players
HC Sparta Praha players
Ice hockey players at the 1948 Winter Olympics
Ice hockey players at the 1956 Winter Olympics
IIHF Hall of Fame inductees
Medalists at the 1948 Winter Olympics
Olympic ice hockey players of Czechoslovakia
Olympic medalists in ice hockey
Olympic silver medalists for Czechoslovakia
Sportspeople from Prague
Czechoslovak defectors
Tennis players from Prague
Czech male tennis players
Czechoslovak ice hockey coaches
Czech ice hockey coaches
Swedish ice hockey coaches
Czech ice hockey centres
Czechoslovak ice hockey centres
Djurgårdens IF Hockey coaches